Heywood's Bank was a private banking firm established and run in Manchester by members of the Heywood family of Pendleton between 1788 and 1874.

Family and banking history 

The bank was founded in Manchester by Benjamin Heywood and his two sons, Benjamin Arthur and Nathaniel Heywood with Barclay, Bevan, Tritton & Co, bankers of City of London, as London agents. They began trading in May 1788

The company was named ‘Benjamin Heywood Sons & Co’. Benjamin had been a partner in Heywood's Bank, Liverpool which he had established in 1773 with his brother Arthur. The brothers had attempted in 1784 to open a branch of their bank at Manchester but the attempt failed and it was decided that a separate firm would have to be formed. They dissolved their partnership and Benjamin moved to Manchester with his sons, taking with him over £10,000 in bills of exchange, while Arthur remained in control of the Liverpool bank renaming it 'Arthur Heywood, Sons & Co'.

On Benjamin's death in 1795, the Manchester firm became known as "Heywood Brothers & Co". In 1814, Nathaniel’s eldest son Benjamin Heywood joined the firm. Nathaniel died in 1815. Two more of Nathaniel’s sons then joined the firm; Thomas in 1818 and Richard in 1820.

Benjamin Arthur Heywood, the last of the original founders, died in 1828 and in 1829 both Thomas and Richard retired from banking, leaving their brother Benjamin as the sole partner. He renamed the Bank "Benjamin Heywood & Co."

Benjamin was created the First Baronet of Claremont in 1838 and he re-titled the bank ‘Sir Benjamin Heywood Bart. & Co’. He later brought his four sons into the firm when they came of age: Oliver, Arthur, Edward and Charles. Benjamin retired in 1860, leaving his sons to run the firm, which they renamed ‘Heywood Brothers & Co’.

Locations 

The bank was opened in Exchange Street, Manchester in 1788. In 1795 they moved to St Ann Street. There was a short-lived attempt to open a branch at Stockport about 1820.

In 1848, the Heywood family had a new building built at 25 St Ann Street. It was designed by John Edgar Gregan, "a three-storey stone clad building in the Italian style, with a deeply rusticated ground floor and two upper floors in ashlar. The ground floor windows, large to light the banking hall, have arched openings, inside which the arched windows are flanked by classical columns. Next to it is a smaller building in brick with stone detailing which was the home of the bank manager" The building is still in use today as a branch of the Royal Bank of Scotland

Sale and closure 

In April 1874, Heywood’s Bank was acquired by the Manchester & Salford Bank for £240,000. In 1890, the Manchester & Salford Bank became Williams Deacon's Bank, which in 1930 was acquired by the Royal Bank of Scotland.

References

See also
Royal Bank of Scotland
Heywood Baronets

Defunct companies based in Manchester
Defunct banks of the United Kingdom
Banks established in 1788
British companies disestablished in 1874
1788 establishments in England
British companies established in 1788